Abdur Rahman Ajmal (born 12 May 1983) is an Indian politician and businessman. He is a member of the Assam Legislative Assembly for the Salmara South constituency.

Early life and family 
Ajmal was born on 12 May 1983 to a Bengali Muslim family from Hojai in central Assam. The family trace their origins to the Sylhet district of eastern Bengal. His grandfather, Haji Ajmal Ali, was a rice farmer who moved to Mumbai in 1950 to try to succeed in the perfume industry using the oud plant. After the opening of the first store in the 1960s, the Ajmal perfume brand quickly grew to become a large brand in the Middle East. Ajmal's father, Badruddin Ajmal, is the founder of the All India United Democratic Front political party and the president of the Jamiat Ulema-e-Assam.

Career 
Ajmal competed in the 2011 Assam Legislative Assembly election as an All India United Democratic Front candidate for Salmara South, defeating Wazed Ali Choudhury by 3756 votes.

References 

1983 births
Living people
Assam MLAs 2011–2016
All India United Democratic Front politicians
People from Dhubri district
20th-century Bengalis
21st-century Bengalis